Aconitum columbianum is a species of flowering plant in the buttercup family known by the common names Columbian monkshood or western monkshood.

This wildflower is native to western North America where it grows in riparian and other moist areas, in meadows and coniferous forests.

Description
Aconitum columbianum is a tall spindly erect to scandent forb which is perennial from rhizomes. It has lobed or toothed leaves and long stems with far-spaced flowers.

The folded, wrinkly flowers are often deep blue or purple, but may also be white or yellowish, and they usually have a spur. The fruits are pod-like follicles.

Like other monkshoods (Aconitum species), this plant is poisonous to humans and livestock, although some species have been used to make drugs.

Subspecies
Subspecies and varieties include:
Aconitum columbianum ssp. columbianum 
Aconitum columbianum var. howellii — Howell's monkshood 
Aconitum columbianum ssp. viviparum

References

External links

Jepson Manual Treatment of Aconitum columbianum
CalFlora Database: Aconitum columbianum
Aconitum columbianum — U.C. Photo gallery

columbianum
Flora of the Western United States
Flora of British Columbia
Flora of California
Flora of Colorado
Flora of New Mexico
Flora of the Rocky Mountains
Flora of the Sierra Nevada (United States)
Flora of the West Coast of the United States
Natural history of the California Coast Ranges
Plants described in 1838
Flora without expected TNC conservation status